Necati is a Turkish given name for males. People named Necati include:

 Necati "Neco" Arabaci (born 1972), Turkish businessman, criminal, and high-ranking member of the Hells Angels

 Necati Ateş (born 1980), Turkish footballer

 Necati Çelim (1909–1986), Turkish politician
 Necati Er (born 1997), Turkish athlete
 Necati Cumalı (1921–2001), Turkish writer
 Necati Şaşmaz (born 1971), Turkish actor
 Necati Zontul, Turkish torture and rape victim

See also
 Nejat (disambiguation)

Turkish masculine given names